Espírito Santo is a state in southeastern Brazil.

Espírito Santo (Portuguese, 'holy spirit') may also refer to:

Places

Brazil
Espírito Santo, Rio Grande do Norte
Espírito Santo, Rio Grande do Sul
Espírito Santo do Pinhal, São Paulo state
Espírito Santo do Turvo, São Paulo state

Portugal
Espírito Santo, a parish of Mértola
Espírito Santo, a parish of Nisa
Igreja do Espírito Santo (Évora), a church in Portugal

Comoros

Espírito Santo, the name given in 1503 to Mayotte

People
Guilherme Espírito Santo (1919–2012), Portuguese footballer and athlete
Alfredo Espírito Santo (born 1938), Angolan-Portuguese footballer
Nuno Espírito Santo (born 1974), Portuguese footballer and manager

Other uses
Espírito Santo Financial Group, a Portuguese holding company
University of Évora, formerly Universidade do Espírito Santo, Portugal

See also 

 Espiritu Santo (disambiguation)
 Holy Spirit (disambiguation)
 Sancti Spiritus (disambiguation)
 Santo Spirito (disambiguation)
 Santo Espírito, Vila do Porto, Azores